Chris Igor N'Goyos (born 18 August 1992) is a professional footballer who plays as a striker. Born in France, he represented the Central African Republic at international level.

Career
Born in Paris, N'Goyos has played for Tours B, Orléans, RFC Huy, Saint-Pryvé Saint-Hilaire, Chartres, Bourges 18, and US Châteauneuf-sur-Loire.

International career 
N'Goyos made his international debut for the Central African Republic in 2013.

References

1992 births
Living people
Footballers from Paris
French footballers
Citizens of the Central African Republic through descent
Central African Republic footballers
Central African Republic international footballers
French sportspeople of Central African Republic descent
French expatriate footballers
Central African Republic expatriate footballers
Tours FC players
US Orléans players
Saint-Pryvé Saint-Hilaire FC players
FC Chartres players
Bourges 18 players
Championnat National players
Championnat National 3 players
Association football forwards
French expatriate sportspeople in Belgium
Central African Republic expatriate sportspeople in Belgium
Expatriate footballers in Belgium